The 1935 NC State Wolfpack football team was an American football team that represented North Carolina State University as a member of the Southern Conference (SoCon) during the 1935 college football season. In its second season under head coach Hunk Anderson, the team compiled a 6–4 record (2–2 against SoCon opponents) and outscored opponents by a total of 87 to 76.

Schedule

References

NC State
NC State Wolfpack football seasons
NC State Wolfpack football